Jan Janszoon van Nes (26 April 1631 – ) was a Dutch admiral and brother of naval commander Aert Janszoon van Nes. They both took part in the Raid on the Medway of 1667. He was buried in the Grote of Sint-Laurenskerk (Rotterdam) Church.

Bibliography 

 
 

1631 births
1680 deaths
Admirals of the navy of the Dutch Republic
Dutch naval personnel of the Anglo-Dutch Wars
Military personnel from Rotterdam